The 1968 Canadian-American Challenge Cup was the third season of the Can-Am auto racing series.  It consisted of FIA Group 7 racing cars running two-hour sprint events.  It began September 1, 1968, and ended November 10, 1968, after six rounds.

Schedule

Season results

Drivers Championship
Points are awarded to the top six finishers in the order of 9-6-4-3-2-1.

References

 
 

 
Can-Am seasons
Can-Am